Jaisalmer Airport  is a domestic airport serving Jaisalmer, Rajasthan, India. The airport operates as a civil enclave on an Indian Air Force base.

Carriers that have previously flown to/from the airport include Vayudoot and Kingfisher Airlines. In 2015, it was not used for civil flights, and was closed until services resumed under the UDAN scheme in 2017.

New civil terminal

The Airports Authority of India has constructed a new passenger terminal at the southern end of the airfield. Construction of the ₹ 80 crore terminal was completed in March 2013. The civil enclave is spread over 65 acres, and consists of the terminal and an apron for parking three Airbus A321 aircraft.

Airlines and destinations

Gallery

References

 Data current as of October 2006.

Airports in Rajasthan
Jaisalmer
Year of establishment missing